Đorđije Lašić (Serbian Cyrillic: Ђорђије Лашић; 5 May 1906 – 5 May 1944) was a Montenegrin Serb military officer of the Royal Yugoslav Army. During the Second World War he participated in the 1941 Uprising in Montenegro, but has soon turned to collaboration with Axis occupation forces until 1944, when he was killed during the bombing of Podgorica.

Early life 
Lašić was born in village of Kami near Andrijevica, Principality of Montenegro. He completed his primary education in Lijeva Rijeka. He started his secondary education in Berane Gymnasium, but due to his bad financial situation he left school in 1918 and enrolled in military school in Ćuprija which he completed in 1922.

World War II

Uprising in Montenegro 

At the beginning of June 1941 he met with the other officers of Royal Yugoslav Army to discuss potential actions against the occupying Axis forces in Montenegro.

According to Ugo Cavallero, most of the insurgent forces were led by former officers of the Kingdom of Yugoslavia until the end of October 1941. During preparation for uprising in Montenegro, the Communist Party of Yugoslavia came in touch with active and reserve officers of the former Royal Yugoslav Army, because there were many young people in the ranks of the insurgents who did not know how to handle a firearm. Thus Lašić became a member of the Partisan Military Committee for Andrijevica. When Axis Albanian units started to concentrate toward the liberated territory, Lašić was co-opted in the District Military Command. Lašić often spoke out against the communist leadership of the uprising. The leadership itself didn't have illusions of prolonged cooperation with Lašić, but were trying not to aggravate relations with him until the Partisans liberated Plav and Gusinje. When the Royal Italian Army began its offensive against the Partisans, Lašić on 4 August abandoned his position in partisan District Military Command and joined the anti-communist group of Ljubo Vuksanović, who opposed further struggle against Axis occupation. After Partisan withdrawal from Berane and Andrijevica in early August, Lašić was a member of the delegation sent to meet the Royal Italian Army. On 5 September Lašić in Lijeva Rijeka gathered people and called for combat against communist rebels.

After the initial major success, the uprising was suppressed within three weeks. Most nationalist commanders took neither side in the sporadic clashes between Italian forces and insurgent forces that became increasingly dominated by Partisans. On September 5, 1941, Lašić organized a gathering of the locals, where he expressed his loyalty to Italians, and threatened insurgent still "in the woods" with force if they don't give in.  Lašić went to Ravna Gora in Serbia to meet Chetnik leader Draža Mihailović. In mid-October 1941 Draža Mihailović appointed Lašić as commander of Chetniks in (Old) Montenegro. Although some evidence suggest that nationalist officers advised civilians to take passive attitude toward Italian forces, there is no indication that they were to collaborate with Italians and their governor Alessandro Pirzio Biroli.

In Lijeva Rijeka (former municipality near Podgorica) Lašić established the first Chetnik military organization at the end of November and Chetnik battalion (Battalion of Lijeva Rijeka) at the beginning of December 1941. He was the first commander of this battalion, which was the first Chetnik battalion in Montenegro.

After the Uprising 
In the second half of December 1941, Pavle Đurišić and Lašić began the mobilization and establishment of armed units separated from Partisans. By the middle of January 1942 these units were in armed conflict with Partisans. Lašić was heavily wounded when two companies of the Kom Partisan detachment attacked Chetniks in Bare Kraljske (near Kolašin), so the command of Chetnik forces at this sector was transferred to Andrija Vesković.

In October 1942, Lašić was part of delegation of Blažo Đukanović, president of Committee that collaborated with Italians, during Đukanović's visit to cities in Italian governorate of Montenegro.

On January 7 1942, Lašić made a proclamation to people of Montenegro to fight against the occupier and to take revenge against Muslims, openly calling for 'Investigation of the Turkified'. As representative of Montenegrin Chetniks, Lašić was present on meeting of Chetnik commanders of Montenegro, Sandžak and Boka Kotorska in village of Šahovići in November and December 1942. Historians Branko Petranović notes that Chetnik leaders from this regions have seemingly accepted Stevan Moljević's vision of ethnically clean Serbia within Yugoslavia, as they decided that no one except Serbs, Croats and Slovenes can live inside new Yugoslavia and that fight against the enemies(mainly communists and Muslims) will be until extermination.

In period between German capture of Pavle Đurišić on 14 May 1943, during their Case Black operation, and his return from German prison in November 1943, Lašić was the only remaining Chetnik commander in Montenegro. His forces were probably no more than 500 men.

Lašić was killed on 5 May 1944 during the bombing of Podgorica by Allies.

References

Books 
 
 
 
 
 
 

1906 births
1944 deaths
Montenegrin Chetnik personnel of World War II
Montenegrin soldiers
Serbs of Montenegro
Montenegrin collaborators with Fascist Italy
Montenegrin collaborators with Nazi Germany
Deaths by airstrike during World War II